The  Ministry of Education of Somalia  is a ministry responsible for education in Somalia. The current Minister of Education of Somalia is Abdulahi Arab. Who hails from Surre, Surre, Dir.

On 29 October 2022, the ministry compound in Mogadishu was attacked by terrorists, killing at least 100 people.

Introduction
Ministry of Education & Culture was the ministry that was responsible for education and culture in Somalia. The ministry has ten departments. On 17 January 2014, newly appointed prime minister, Abdiweli Sheikh Ahmed split the ministerial portfolio into Ministry of Education and Ministry of Culture and Higher Education, respectively.

Organization
 Minister of Education
Deputy Minister
 Secretary-General
 Under the Authority of Secretary-General
 Internal Audit Division
 Corporate Communications Unit
 Education Performance and Delivery Unit
Deputy Secretary-General (Education Development)
 Education Development Division
 Procurement and Asset Management Division
 Policy and International Relations Division
Deputy Secretary-General (Management)
 Finance Division
 Human Resource Management Division
 Account Division
Director-General of Education
 Deputy Director-General of Education 
 Educational Planning and Research Division
 Curriculum Development Division
 Examination Syndicate
Under the Authority of Director-General of Education
 Banaadir Education Department
 Lower Shabele Education Department
 Baay Education Department
 Bakool Education Department
 Gedo Education Department
 Middle Juba Education Department
 Lower Juba Education Department
 Middle Shabele Education Department
 Hiiraan Education Department
 Galgaduud Education Department
 Puntland State Education Department
 Somaliland State Education Department
Department of umbrella and private education
Department of Public Schools
Office of examinations and Certification

External links
 Official Ministry website

References

Education
Education in Somalia
Somalia
Somalia
Government agencies established in 2010
Government of Somalia
Somalia, Education
Language regulators
Somali language
Somali culture